Lotusflow3r is a triple album set by American recording artist Prince and protégée Bria Valente. It contains the thirty-third and thirty-fourth studio albums by Prince, Lotusflow3r (stylized as LOtUSFLOW3R) and MPLSound (stylized as MPLSoUND), as well as Elixer, the debut studio album by Bria Valente. It was released on March 24, 2009, by NPG Records. The three albums were sold exclusively in the United States at Target as a 3-disc set, and in Europe from more online music stores.

The album debuted at No. 2 on the US Billboard 200 chart, selling 168,000 copies in its first week. Along with the set's other albums, Lotusflow3r received generally mixed to positive reviews from music critics.

Production 

The album was recorded and mixed by Richard Furch.

Release and promotion
In December 2008, four songs were premiered on Los Angeles radio station Indie 103: a cover of "Crimson and Clover", "4ever", "Colonized Mind" and "Wall of Berlin". A month later in a Los Angeles Times article, further song titles were mentioned, namely "Hey Valentina" (written for Salma Hayek's daughter),  "Better with Time" (an ode to Under the Cherry Moon co-star Kristin Scott Thomas), "Love Like Jazz", "$" (about "the most popular girl in the whole wide world"), and "77 Beverly Park".

To generate excitement, Prince launched mplsound.com in December 2008 offering an instrumental of "(There'll Never B) Another Like Me", later replaced by the finished track. A month later, the site was shut down and replaced with an announcement of a new interactive website (lotusflow3r.com), proclaiming it would allow fans to "listen, watch and buy" music and videos featuring Prince and guest artists. The site, possibly acknowledging early reviews that the music hearkens back to his Purple Rain days (and the fact that 2009 marked its 25th anniversary), featured a thrown-down television set on a cliff with a frame from the movie. The site had three songs for listening: "Crimson and Clover", "Here Eye Come", and "(There'll Never B) Another Like Me". A couple of weeks later, it was updated again with more interactive content. The site contained 60-second samples of three songs: "Chocolate Box", "Colonized Mind", "All This Love". On January 31, more changes were made with a new instrumental available for listening, as well as a "teaser" video. The site also had three full songs for listening: "Colonized Mind", "Discojellyfish" (an instrumental non-album track based on "Chocolate Box"), and "Another Boy", which is sung by Valente.

The album contains a few songs previously known by fans. "Feel Good, Feel Better, Feel Wonderful" was posted on Prince's now-defunct NPG Music Club website as a one-minute demo in 2006, "U're Gonna C Me" is a remake of a track from Prince's 2002 album One Nite Alone... and "Kept Woman" is a track from Prince's unreleased 2006 project with Támar called Milk and Honey. Originally intended to be released together with Prince's 3121 album, the project was eventually leaked onto the internet by Támar on her website. "Here I Come" had been posted on Prince's now-defunct 3121.com site in 2007. An excerpt of the song "Home" was posted on drfunkenberry.com in 2008 and the track "Another Boy" was debuted on radio and iTunes in 2008.

On March 11, 2009, it was announced on Billboard.com that Prince would perform on The Tonight Show with Jay Leno three nights in a row, March 25–27. He performed "Ol' Skool Company", "Dreamer" and "Feel Better, Feel Good, Feel Wonderful". Prince also performed "Crimson and Clover" on The Ellen DeGeneres Show and along with Bria Valente gave a two-part interview on the Tavis Smiley show in which he revealed he was born epileptic. During a fourth The Tonight Show appearance on May 28, in celebration of the end of Leno's first run as host of the show, Prince also performed "Somewhere Here on Earth" from his 2007 Planet Earth album.

On March 23, a demo of the song "Chocolate Box" (without Q-Tip) was leaked onto the internet. On March 24, at 7:07 pm PST, lotusflow3r.com opened officially. Members who joined early and paid the $77/year fee got to view streaming video (including the cover of Radiohead's "Creep" performed at the 2008 Coachella festival) and music videos for the tracks "Chocolate Box", "Crimson and Clover" and "Everytime", download all three albums (detailed below), were sent a "founding member" t-shirt and were able to buy tickets to future concerts Prince would be doing in the LA area, including The Tonight Show performances. Later in 2009, Prince performed two shows in Montreux during the Montreux Jazz Festival and released a re-recorded version of the 1986 outtake "In a Large Room with No Light" to promote the concerts. Later Prince, also performed three shows in Monaco. On October 14 Prince performed on the French television program "Le Grand Journal" on Canal + to promote Lotusflow3r after playing three concerts in Paris. He performed the songs "Dance 4 Me", "No More Candy 4 U", "1999" and "Controversy".

The album was released as a physical release a few days later as a Target exclusive for the price of US$11.98. Even though the album was only released in the US, many copies were exported for sale in Europe. Warner Music released the album in France on September 7, as a single CD ("MPLSound") and a limited 3 CD. "Dance 4 Me" was digitally released on August 31 as a single, reaching No.38 on the French digital singles chart and No.1 on the British Dance Chart. Three remixes ("Icon Remix", "Tribal Drum Remix" and "Dominatrix Remix") of the song were later released on the independent "Purple Music" label in 2011. The "Icon Remix" was later released as a standalone single for a limited time on iTunes and a "making of" for the remix was posted on YouTube.

The song "Crimson and Clover" was replaced by the 2006 outtake "The Morning After" on the digital version of the album.

Reception

The album debuted at number two on the US Billboard 200, selling 168,000 copies in its first week and becoming Prince's fourth consecutive top-three album in the United States. The album narrowly missed the number one spot, selling 3000 copies less than Keith Urban's Defying Gravity. The album however topped some other charts leading Prince to suspect the charts were tampered with, which he specifically stated on the Tavis Smiley interview. As of February 1, 2012, the album has sold 543,700 units, according to SoundScan.

Upon their release, Lotusflow3r and MPLSound received generally mixed to positive reviews from most music critics, based on aggregate scores of 61 and 62/100 from Metacritic. Bria Valente's Elixer received generally mixed or average reviews from most music critics, receiving an aggregate score of 49/100 from Metacritic.

Track listings

Lotusflow3r

*"Crimson and Clover" includes an interpolation of Chip Taylor's "Wild Thing".

MPLSound
All songs written by Prince.

Elixer
All songs written by Prince and Bria Valente, except "Kept Woman" written solely by Prince. All tracks sung by Bria Valente.

Chart history

Weekly charts

Year-end charts

References

External links
 Lotusflow3r at Discogs
 Lotusflow3r, MPLSound, Elixer at Metacritic
 Album Review at About.com

2009 albums
Prince (musician) albums
Albums produced by Prince (musician)
NPG Records albums
Experimental pop albums